Trox tuberculatus is a beetle of the Family Trogidae.

References 

tuberculatus
Beetles described in 1774